Joshua Shaw (born 3 January 1996) is an English cricketer who plays for Gloucestershire County Cricket Club. He is a right-arm medium-fast bowler who also bats right-handed. He made his Twenty20 debut for Yorkshire against Durham in the 2015 NatWest t20 Blast in July 2015. He made his first-class cricket debut for Gloucestershire against Durham MCC University on 31 March 2016. He made his List A debut for Gloucestershire against the Australia A cricket team on 2 July 2019.

References

External links
 

1996 births
Living people
English cricketers
Yorkshire cricketers
Gloucestershire cricketers